The Umbrella Woman (released in some areas as The Good Wife) is a 1987 film directed by Ken Cameron and starring Bryan Brown and Rachel Ward. It also features Steven Vidler and Sam Neill.

Premise
The film tells the story of a man and wife whose marriage is complicated by a relationship between the man's brother and his wife, and his wife's attraction to the manager of the local bar. The setting is pre-war Australia.

Cast
 Rachel Ward as Marge Hills
 Bryan Brown as Sonny Hills
 Steven Vidler as Sugar Hills
 Sam Neill as Neville Gifford
 Jeniffer Claire as Daisy
 Bruce Barry as Archie
 Peter Cummins as Ned Hopper
 Carole Skinner as Mrs. Gibson
 Clarissa Kaye as Mrs. Jackson
 Barry Hill as Mr. Fielding
 Susan Lyons as Mrs. Fielding
 Helen Jones as Rosie Gibbs
 Lisa Hensley (actress) as Sylvia
 May Howlett as Mrs. Carmicheal
 Maureen Green as Sal Day
 Gerry Cook as Gerry Day
 Harold Kissin as Davis
 Oliver Hall as Mick Jones
 Sue Ingleton as Rita
 Maurice Hughes as Sgt. Larkin
 Marg Haynes as Greta
 Craig Fuller as Charlie

Production
Producer Jan Sharp originally intended her husband, Phillip Noyce to direct but he went on to make Echoes of Paradise instead so she hired Ken Cameron. Cameron:
I was very happy to do it but it was a picture that I think would always be hard to do. It's terribly hard to do Madame Bovary in Australia and it's very hard to graft, say, that European style of melodrama or melodramatically intense view of family and sexual relations on to the Australian landscape. There's something there that refuses to play the game about the Australian country town.

Box office
The Umbrella Woman grossed $100,189 at the box office in Australia. The film was not widely seen overseas either. Cameron says the movie hurt his career:
I think the reason that it didn't work was that there was something very difficult to understand about the relationship between Bryan and Rachel. They were at the height of their public relationship, very well known as a happy couple. It was terribly hard to cast them as a couple who had some unstated problem in their marriage because everything in fact denied that. So it was hard to understand why she would run after the barman when Bryan was there, because Bryan is quite iconic and quite wonderful as an Australian country man... Without wishing Sam Neill away, because I think he's terrific - it might have worked better had Bryan been the barman... I think that this was an example of how you can cast a film with great excitement, get all these wonderful actors but, at the same time, in the very act of casting, you're blighting it or preventing the drama from emerging successfully.

See also
Cinema of Australia

References

External links
 
 
 
The Umbrella Woman at Oz Movies

1987 films
1987 drama films
Films directed by Ken Cameron
Films set in Australia
Australian drama films
1980s English-language films